Ghandhara Industries Limited (GIL), formerly known as National Motors Limited, is a Pakistani truck and bus manufacturer based in Karachi, Pakistan. It is the authorized assembler and manufacturer of Isuzu vehicles in Pakistan.

The major business activities of the company are progressive manufacturing, assembling and marketing Isuzu trucks and buses at its plant in S.I.T.E., Karachi.

History
The company was established in Karachi by the General Motors Overseas Distribution in 1953.

In February 1963, the company was acquired by Habibullah Khan Khattak who renamed it Ghandhara Industries Limited.

In 1972, the government nationalized Ghandhara Industries and renamed it National Motors Limited. The company's franchises Bedford Vehicles and Toyota produced buses and cars.

In 1984, the Toyota franchise was transferred to Toyota Indus.

In 1992, Bibojee Services acquired National Motors Limited. The Bibojee companies are owned by the heirs of Habibullah Khan Khattak.

In 1999, the company renamed to its original name.

In 2017, Ghandhara Industries made it to 'Forbes Asia's 200 Best Under A Billion list of companies.

Products 
(Double Cab/Pickup Truck)

Isuzu D-Max

N series/Isuzu Elf trucks

Isuzu NHR55
Isuzu NKR55
Isuzu NPR66
Isuzu NPS71

F series/Isuzu Forward trucks and prime movers

 Isuzu FTR33
 Isuzu FVR34/90
 Isuzu FVZ
 Isuzu FVZ340 HD
 Isuzu FTS33H

C series/Isuzu Giga trucks and prime movers
 Isuzu CYZ

Buses/Coaches
NKR55 Microbus
NPR66 Minicoach
MT133/MT134 (Passenger Bus)

See also
 General Motors Corporation
 Isuzu
 List of automobile manufacturers

References

External links
Bibojee Group of Companies
 Ghandhara Industries Limited Official Site 
 General Motors Corporation Official Website
 Isuzu Motors America

 Bus manufacturers of Pakistan
 Truck manufacturers of Pakistan
 Manufacturing companies based in Karachi
 Vehicle manufacturing companies established in 1953
 Pakistani subsidiaries of foreign companies
 Former General Motors subsidiaries
 Isuzu
 Companies listed on the Pakistan Stock Exchange
 Formerly government-owned companies of Pakistan
1992 mergers and acquisitions
 Pakistani companies established in 1953